Moscow–Saint Petersburg high-speed railway is a planned high-speed railway line in Russia. According to Russian Railways, construction is scheduled to begin in 2021. The journey time will be approximately 2 hours 19 minutes, and the length of the line will be 679 km.

See also 
 Saint Petersburg–Moscow railway

References 

High-speed railway lines in Russia